Beautiful Disease is an unreleased solo album by Guns N' Roses bassist Duff McKagan which was slated to be released as his second solo album in 1999. However, it was shelved after a merger between McKagan's parent label Polygram and Universal, and McKagan lost the rights to release it.

Overview
The album was recorded through 1998 in Duff McKagan's home studio with all the instruments and vocals on the album provided by McKagan himself, with the addition of guests like Mike Bordin, Michael Barragan, Abe Laboriel Jr and ex-Guns N' Roses members Slash and Izzy Stradlin. Beautiful Disease included new versions of the songs "Seattlehead" and "Mezz" that were previously featured on releases of Duff McKagan's previous bands, Neurotic Outsiders and 10 Minute Warning respectively.

The album was supposed to be released on Duff McKagan's birthday February 5, 1999. The promotional campaign for the album was started by Geffen Records with promo copies being distributed. During the same time a merger between Polygram and Universal occurred and Geffen was merged with A&M Records into Interscope and McKagan's album was among others that was shelved.

Nevertheless, Duff McKagan went on tour in support of the album putting up a band with Dez Cadena of Black Flag, Taz Bentley of the Burden Brothers and Michael Barragan of Plexi.

During the tour McKagan came up with the idea to release a live album that would include the unreleased material. This resulted in Loaded's Episode 1999: Live live album that featured six songs from Beautiful Disease: "Seattlehead", "Superman", "Shinin' Down", "Missing You", "Then and Now" and "Mezz".

The songs "Seattlehead", "Superman", and "Then and Now" were eventually re-recorded and released on Loaded's debut studio album Dark Days.

Track listing
All songs written by Duff McKagan, except where noted.

"Seattlehead" - 4:17
"Who's to Blame" - 2:06
"Superman" - 3:12
"Song for Beverly" - 4:33
"Put You Back" (Duff McKagan, Izzy Stradlin) - 3:24
"Shinin' Down" (Al Bloch) - 2:54
"Missing You" (Duff McKagan, Michael Barragan) - 4:52
"Hope" - 4:32
"Holiday" (Al Bloch) - 2:22
"Then and Now" (Duff McKagan, Paul Solger) - 4:10
"Rain" - 4:17
"Beautiful Disease" (Duff McKagan, Eddie Hewlett) - 2:43
"Mezz" - 4:42

Personnel

Studio personnel
Duff McKagan - vocals, bass guitar, guitar, drums

Additional personnel
Slash - lead guitar on "Hope" and "Mezz"
Izzy Stradlin - rhythm guitar on "Put You Back"
Mike Bordin - drums
Michael Barragan - rhythm guitar on "Missing you", "Who's to Blame" and "Then and Now", Moog Prodigy on "Missing you"
Norm Block - drums on "Missing you", "Who's to Blame" and "Then and Now"

References

Duff McKagan albums
Unreleased albums